Fran Álvarez may refer to:

Fran Álvarez (footballer, born 1996), Spanish football defender
Fran Álvarez (footballer, born 1998), Spanish football midfielder